The 1969 Senior League World Series took place from August 12–16 in Gary, Indiana, United States. Sacramento, California defeated Gary, Indiana in the championship game.

This year featured the debut of the European region.

Teams

Results

References

Senior League World Series
Senior League World Series
Baseball competitions in Indiana
Sports in Gary, Indiana
1969 in sports in Indiana